Pedaliodiscus is a monotypic genus of flowering plants belonging to the family Pedaliaceae. The only species is Pedaliodiscus macrocarpus.

Its native range is Eastern Tropical Africa.

References

Pedaliaceae
Monotypic Lamiales genera